The North Aleutians Basin is a geographic phenomenon, primarily a submarine depression, occurring in the southern Bristol Bay region of the Bering Sea and just off the northern shore of the Alaska Peninsula.  It extends some 600 miles (960 km) along the Alaska Peninsula (northeast-southwest) and nearly as far north–south into the center of the Bering Sea. Primarily composed of gravel and sand, the near-shore zone is famously muddy towards its eastern flank.

As recently as October 2005, both the state of Alaska and the U.S. Minerals Management Service had plans to develop the oil and natural gas potential of the area. One proposal would have offshore platforms extracting natural gas north of the village of Nelson Lagoon and transporting the gas via pipeline to a processing facility to the Pacific Ocean side near Sand Point.

External links
 Anchorage Daily News article about the Shell development proposal

Oceanic basins of the Pacific Ocean
Bering Sea